PGPfone was a secure voice telephony system developed by Philip Zimmermann in 1995.  The PGPfone protocol had little in common with Zimmermann's popular PGP email encryption package, except for the use of the name.  It used ephemeral Diffie-Hellman protocol to establish a session key, which was then used to encrypt the stream of voice packets.  The two parties compared a short authentication string to detect a Man-in-the-middle attack, which is the most common method of wiretapping secure phones of this type.  PGPfone could be used point-to-point (with two modems) over the public switched telephone network, or over the Internet as an early Voice over IP system.

In 1996, there were no protocol standards for Voice over IP. Ten years later, Zimmermann released the successor to PGPfone, Zfone and ZRTP, a newer and secure VoIP protocol based on modern VoIP standards.  Zfone builds on the ideas of PGPfone.

According to the MIT PGPfone web page, "MIT is no longer distributing PGPfone. Given that the software has not been maintained since 1997, we doubt it would run on most modern systems."

See also
 Comparison of VoIP software
 Nautilus (secure telephone)
 PGP word list
 Secure telephone

References

External links
 PGPfone homepage on PGPi
 Old PGPfone homepage on MIT
 PGPfone sources, modified to build on modern systems

Secure communication
Cryptographic software
VoIP software